This is a list of hospitals located in Sargodha, Pakistan.

Public Hospitals

Military Hospitals

Private Hospitals

See also
Sargodha
List of educational institutes in Sargodha
List of hospitals in Pakistan
List of hospitals in Punjab, Pakistan
List of hospitals in Karachi
List of hospitals in Lahore

References

Sargodha
Sargodha